Hodonín District is a district in the South Moravian Region of the Czech Republic. Its capital is the town of Hodonín.

Administrative division
Hodonín District is divided into three administrative districts of municipalities with extended competence: Hodonín, Kyjov and Veselí nad Moravou.

List of municipalities
Towns are marked in bold and market towns in italics:

Archlebov - 
Blatnice pod Svatým Antonínkem - 
Blatnička - 
Bukovany - 
Bzenec - 
Čejč - 
Čejkovice - 
Čeložnice - 
Dambořice - 
Dolní Bojanovice - 
Domanín - 
Dražůvky - 
Dubňany - 
Hodonín -
Hovorany - 
Hroznová Lhota - 
Hrubá Vrbka - 
Hýsly - 
Javorník - 
Ježov - 
Josefov - 
Karlín - 
Kelčany - 
Kněždub - 
Kostelec - 
Kozojídky -
Kuželov - 
Kyjov - 
Labuty - 
Lipov - 
Louka - 
Lovčice - 
Lužice - 
Malá Vrbka - 
Mikulčice - 
Milotice -
Mouchnice - 
Moravany - 
Moravský Písek - 
Mutěnice - 
Násedlovice - 
Nechvalín - 
Nenkovice - 
Nová Lhota - 
Nový Poddvorov - 
Ostrovánky - 
Petrov - 
Prušánky - 
Radějov - 
Ratíškovice - 
Rohatec - 
Šardice - 
Skalka - 
Skoronice -
Sobůlky - 
Starý Poddvorov - 
Stavěšice - 
Strážnice - 
Strážovice - 
Sudoměřice - 
Suchov - 
Svatobořice-Mistřín - 
Syrovín - 
Tasov - 
Těmice - 
Terezín - 
Tvarožná Lhota - 
Uhřice - 
Vacenovice -
Velká nad Veličkou - 
Veselí nad Moravou - 
Věteřov - 
Vlkoš - 
Vnorovy - 
Vracov -
Vřesovice - 
Žádovice - 
Žarošice - 
Ždánice -
Želetice - 
Žeravice - 
Žeraviny

Geography

Hodonín District borders Slovakia in the south. The terrain is very varied. A large part consists of the lowland, which belongs to the warmest and driest areas in the country. The north and southeast of the territory is hilly. The territory extends into seven geomorphological mesoregions: Lower Morava Valley (southwest and centre), Kyjov Hills (a strip from west to east), Ždánice Forest (northwest), Chřiby (small part in the northeast), Vizovice Highlands (east), White Carpathians (southeast), and Chvojnice Hills (a negligible area along the Czech-Slovak border).

The main river of the district is the Morava, which flows across the district from east to southwest and partly forms the Czech-Slovak border. Its most important tributaries in the district are Kyjovka and Velička. The Myjava River springs here.

Overall, the territory of the district is poor in bodies of water, but there is a numerous system of ponds on the Kyjovka River. The largest of the ponds is Jarohněvický with an area of almost .

Bílé Karpaty is a protected landscape area that extends into the district in the southeast.

Demographics

Most populated municipalities

Economy
The largest employers with its headquarters in Hodonín District and at least 500 employers are:

Transport
There are no motorways passing through the district. The most important roads are the I/54 and I/55 roads.

Sights

The most important monuments in the district, protected as national cultural monuments, are:
Slavic gord of Mikulčice-Valy
Milotice Castle
Windmill in Kuželov
Belfry in Louka

The best-preserved settlements, protected as monument reservations and monument zones, are:
Blatnice pod Svatým Antonínkem-Stará Hora (monument reservation)
Petrov-Plže (monument reservation)
Kyjov
Strážnice
Veselí nad Moravou
Vápenky
Javorník-Kopánky

The most visited tourist destination is the Hodonín Zoo.

References

External links

Hodonín District profile on the Czech Statistical Office's website

 
Districts of the Czech Republic